Umbyquyra is a genus of South American tarantulas first described in 2018.

Species 
 it contains twelve species:
Umbyquyra acuminata (Schmidt & Tesmoingt, 2005) — Bolivia, Brazil
Umbyquyra araguaia Gargiulo, Brescovit & Lucas, 2018 — Brazil
Umbyquyra belterra Gargiulo, Brescovit & Lucas, 2018 — Brazil
Umbyquyra caxiuana Gargiulo, Brescovit & Lucas, 2018 — Brazil
Umbyquyra cuiaba Gargiulo, Brescovit & Lucas, 2018 — Brazil
Umbyquyra gurleyi sherwood & Gabriel, 2020 – Brazil
Umbyquyra palmarum (Schiapelli & Gerschman, 1945) — Brazil
Umbyquyra paranaiba Gargiulo, Brescovit & Lucas, 2018 — Brazil
Umbyquyra sapezal Gargiulo, Brescovit & Lucas, 2018 — Brazil
Umbyquyra schmidti (Rudloff, 1996) — Brazil
Umbyquyra tapajos Gargiulo, Brescovit & Lucas, 2018 — Brazil
Umbyquyra tucurui Gargiulo, Brescovit & Lucas, 2018 — Brazil

References

External links

Theraphosidae genera
Theraphosidae